The 2011 Porsche Carrera Cup Italia season was the fifth Porsche Carrera Cup Italy season. It began on 30 April in Imola and finished on 16 October in Monza. Alessandro Balzan won the championship driving for Ebimotors, which won the teams' championship.

Teams and drivers

Race calendar and results

Championship standings

Drivers' Championship

† — Drivers did not finish the race, but were classified as they completed over 75% of the race distance.

   - the Nürburgring round assigned 20 points to all the participants, regardless of the final result.

Teams' Championship

† — Drivers did not finish the race, but were classified as they completed over 75% of the race distance.

   - the Nürburgring round assigned 20 points to all the participants, regardless of the final result.

Michelin Cup
The Michelin Cup is the trophy reserved to the gentlemen drivers.

Under-25 Trophy
The Under-25 Trophy is reserved to the under-25-year-old drivers.

External links
 

Porsche Carrera Cup Italy seasons
Porsche Carrera Cup Italy